Hayton is a village and civil parish in the East Riding of Yorkshire, England. It lies on the A1079 road.

The parish includes Burnby together with the hamlet of Thorpe le Street. Although the civil parish is called "Hayton" its parish council is called "Hayton and Burnby Parish Council". On 1 April 1935 Burnby and Thorpe le Street parish was abolished and merged with Hayton.

The church dedicated to St Martin was designated a Grade I listed building in 1967 and is now recorded in the National Heritage List for England, maintained by Historic England.

In 1823 Hayton was a village and a civil parish in the Wapentake of Harthill. The ecclesiastical parish was Hayton-cum-Beilby, with the parish incumbent living under the patronage of the Dean of York. Population at the time was 177. Occupations included twelve farmers, a blacksmith, a wheelwright, a corn miller, a shoemaker, and the landlord of The White Horse public house.

References

External links

Villages in the East Riding of Yorkshire
Civil parishes in the East Riding of Yorkshire